Information and media literacy (IML) enables people to show and make informed judgments as users of information and media, as well as to become skillful creators and producers of information and media messages in their own right. Renee Hobbs suggests that “few people verify the information they find online ― both adults and children tend to uncritically trust information they find, from whatever source.” People need to gauge the credibility of information and can do so by answering three questions:

 Who is the author?
 What is the purpose of this message?
 How was this message constructed?

Prior to the 1990s, the primary focus of information literacy was research skills. Media literacy, a study that emerged around the 1970s, traditionally focuses on the analysis and the delivery of information through various forms of media. These days, the study of information literacy has been extended to include the study of media literacy in many countries like the UK, Australia and New Zealand. The term "information and media literacy" is used by UNESCO to differentiate the combined study from the existing study of information literacy. It is also referred to as information and communication technologies (ICT) in the United States. Educators such as Gregory Ulmer have also defined the field as electracy.

IML is a combination of information literacy and media literacy. The transformative nature of IML includes creative works and creating new knowledge; to publish and collaborate responsibly requires ethical, cultural and social understanding.

Information and Media Literacy In the Digital Age 
The modern digital age has led to the proliferation of information spread across the Internet. Individuals must be able to recognize whether information is true or false and better yet know how to locate, evaluate, use, and communicate information in various formats; this is called information literacy.

21st-century students
The IML learning capacities prepare students to be 21st century literate.  According to Jeff Wilhelm (2000), "technology has everything to do with literacy. And being able to use the latest electronic technologies has everything to do with being literate." He supports his argument with J. David Bolter's statement that "if our students are not reading and composing with various electronic technologies, then they are illiterate. They are not just unprepared for the future; they are illiterate right now, in our current time and context".

Wilhelm's statement is supported by the 2005 Wired World Phase II (YCWW II) survey conducted by the Media Awareness Network of Canada on 5000 Grade 4 – 11 students. The key findings of the survey were:
62% of Grade 4 students prefer the Internet.
38% of Grade 4 students prefer the library.
91% of Grade 11 students prefer the Internet.
9% of Grade 11 students prefer the library.

Marc Prensky (2001) uses the term "digital native" to describe people who have been brought up in a digital world. The Internet has been a pervasive element of young people's home lives. 94% of kids reported that they had Internet access at home, and a significant majority (61%) had a high-speed connection.

By the time kids reach Grade 11, half of them (51 percent) have their own Internet-connected computer, separate and apart from the family computer. The survey also showed that young Canadians are now among the most wired in the world. Contrary to the earlier stereotype of the isolated and awkward computer nerd, today's wired kid is a social kid.

In general, many students are better networked through the use of technology than most teachers and parents, who may not understand the abilities of technology. Students are no longer limited to desktop computer. They may use mobile technologies to graph mathematical problems, research a question for social studies, text message an expert for information, or send homework to a drop box. Students are accessing information by using MSN, personal Web pages, Weblogs and social networking sites.

Information Literacy is taught to college students in programs such as Chiropractic to shift such fields more towards Evidence Based Practice. Courses which accomplish this are preferentially titled "Information Lit Lab", as opposed to "Information Literacy Lab" or "Information Literacy Laboratory".

Teaching and learning in the 21st century 

Many teachers continue the tradition of teaching of the past 50 years. Traditionally teachers have been the experts sharing their knowledge with children. Technology, and the learning tools it provides access to, forces us to change to being facilitators of learning.  We have to change the stereotype of teacher as the expert who delivers information, and students as consumers of information, in order to meet the needs of digital students. Teachers not only need to learn to speak digital, but also to embrace the language of digital natives.

Language is generally defined as a system used to communicate in which symbols convey information.  Digital natives can communicate fluently with digital devices and convey information in a way that was impossible without digital devices. People born prior to 1988 are sometimes referred to as "digital immigrants."  They experience difficulty programming simple devices like a VCR.  Digital immigrants do not start pushing buttons to make things work.

Learning a language is best done early in a child's development.

In acquiring a second language, Hyltenstam (1992) found that around the age of 6 and 7 seemed to be a cut-off point for bilinguals to achieve native-like proficiency.  After that age, second language learners could get near-native-like-ness but their language would, while consisting of very few actual errors, have enough errors that would set them apart from the first language group. Although more recent research suggests this impact still exists up to 10 years of age.

Kindergarten and grades 1 and 2 are critical to student success as digital natives because not all students have a "digital"-rich childhood.  Students learning technological skills before Grade 3 can become equivalently bilingual. "Language-minority students who cannot read and write proficiently in English cannot participate fully in American schools, workplaces, or society. They face limited job opportunities and earning power." Speaking "digital" is as important as being literate in order to participate fully in North American society and opportunities.

Students' struggle
Many students are considered illiterate in media and information for various reasons. They may not see the value of media and information literacy in the 21st-century classroom.  Others are not aware of the emergence of the new form of information.  Educators need to introduce IML to these students to help them become media and information literate.  Very little changes will be made if the educators are not supporting information and media literacy in their own classrooms.

Performance standards, the foundation to support them, and tools to implement them are readily available.  Success will come when there is full implementation and equitable access are established.  Shared vision and goals that focus on strategic actions with measurable results are also necessary.

When the staff and community, working together, identify and clarify their values, beliefs, assumptions, and perceptions about what they want children to know and be able to do, an important next step will be to discover which of these values and expectations will be achieved. Using the capacity tools to assess IML will allow students, staff and the community to reflect on how well students are meeting learning needs as related to technology.

The IML Performance standards allow data collection and analysis to evidence that student-learning needs are being met.  After assessing student IML, three questions can be asked:

 What does each student need to learn?
 How does one know whether students have met the capacities?
 How does one respond when students have difficulty in learning?

Teachers can use classroom assessment for learning to identify areas that might need increased focus and support.  Students can use classroom assessment to set learning goals for themselves.

In the curriculum
This integration of technology across the curriculum is a positive shift from computers being viewed as boxes to be learned to computers being used as technical communication tools.  In addition, recent learning pedagogy recognizes the inclusion for students to be creators of knowledge through technology. International Society for Technology in Education (ISTE) has been developing a standard IML curriculum for the US and other countries by implementing the National Educational Technology Standards.

United Kingdom
In the UK, IML has been promoted among educators through an information literacy website developed by several organizations that have been involved in the field.

United States
IML is included in the Partnership for the 21st Century program sponsored by the US Department of Education. Special mandates have been provided to Arizona, Iowa, Kansas, Maine, New Jersey, Massachusetts, North Carolina, South Dakota, West Virginia and Wisconsin. Individual school districts, such as the Clarkstown Central School District, have also developed their own information literacy curriculum. ISTE has also produced the National Educational Technology Standards for Students, Teachers and Administrators.

Canada
In British Columbia, Canada, the Ministry of Education has de-listed the Information Technology K to 7 IRP  as a stand-alone course.  It is still expected that all the prescribed learning outcomes continue to be integrated.

This integration of technology across the curriculum is a positive shift from computers being viewed as boxes to be learned to computers being used as technical communication tools. In addition, recent learning pedagogy recognizes the inclusion for students to be creators of knowledge through technology.  Unfortunately, there has been no clear direction to implement IML.

The BC Ministry of Education published the Information and Communications Technology Integration Performance Standards, Grades 5 to 10 ICTI in 2005.  These standards provide performance standards expectations for Grade 5 to 10; however, they do not provide guidance for other grades, and the expectation for a Grade 5 and Grade 10 student are the same.

Arab World

In the Arab region, media and information literacy was largely ignored up until 2011, when the Media Studies Program at the American University of Beirut, the Open Society Foundations and the Arab-US Association for Communication Educators (AUSACE) launched a regional conference themed "New Directions: Digital and Media Literacy". The conference attracted significant attention from Arab universities and scholars, who discussed obstacles and needs to advance media literacy in the Arab region, including developing curricula in Arabic, training faculty and promoting the field.

Following up on that recommendation, the Media Studies Program at AUB and the Open Society Foundations in collaboration with the Salzburg Academy on Media and Global Change launched in 2013 the first regional initiative to develop, vitalize, and advance media literacy education in the Arab region. The Media and Digital Literacy Academy of Beirut (MDLAB) offered an annual two-week summer training program in addition to working year-round to develop media literacy curricula and programs. The academy is conducted in Arabic and English and brings pioneering international instructors and professionals to teach advanced digital and media literacy concepts to young Arab academics and graduate students from various fields. MDLAB hopes that the participating Arab academics will carry what they learned to their countries and institutions and offers free curricular material in Arabic and English, including media literacy syllabi, lectures, exercises, lesson plans, and multi-media material, to assist and encourage the integration of digital and media literacy into Arab university and school curricula.

In recognition of MDLAB's accomplishments in advancing media literacy education in the Arab region, the founder of MDLAB received the 2015 UNESCO-UNAOC International Media and Information Literacy Award.

Prior to 2013, only two Arab universities offered media literacy courses: the American University of Beirut (AUB) and the American University of Sharjah (AUS). Three years after the launch of MDLAB, over two dozen Arab universities incorporated media literacy education into their curricula, both as stand-alone courses or as modules injected into their existing media courses. Among the universities who have full-fledged media literacy courses (as of 2015) are Lebanese American University (Lebanon), Birzeit University (Palestine), University of Balamand (Lebanon), Damascus University (Syria), Rafik Hariri University (Lebanon), Notre Dame University (Lebanon), Ahram Canadian University (Egypt), American University of Beirut (Lebanon), American University of Sharjah (UAE), and Al Azm University (Lebanon). The first Arab school to adopt media literacy as part of its strategic plan is the International College (IC) in Lebanon. Efforts to introduce media literacy to the region's other universities and schools continues with the help of other international organizations, such as UNESCO, UNAOC, AREACORE, DAAD, and OSF.

Asia
In Singapore and Hong Kong, information literacy or information technology was listed as a formal curriculum.

Barriers

One barrier to learning to read is the lack of books, while a barrier to learning IML is the lack of technology access. Highlighting the value of IML helps to identify existing barriers within school infrastructure, staff development, and support systems.  While there is a continued need to work on the foundations to provide a sustainable and equitable access, the biggest obstacle is school climate.

Marc Prensky identifies one barrier as teachers viewing digital devices as distractions: "Let's admit the real reason that we ban cell phones is that, given the opportunity to use them, students would vote with their attention, just as adults would 'vote with their feet' by leaving the room when a presentation is not compelling."

The mindset of banning new technology, and fearing the bad things that can happen, can affect educational decisions. The decision to ban digital devices impacts students for the rest of their lives.

Any tool that is used poorly or incorrectly can be unsafe.  Safety lessons are mandatory in industrial technology and science.  Yet safety or ethical lessons are not mandatory to use technology.

Not all decisions in schools are measured by common ground beliefs.  One school district in Ontario banned digital devices from their schools.  Local schools have been looking at doing the same. These kinds of reactions are often about immediate actions and not about teaching, learning or creating solutions.  Many barriers to IML exist.

See also
 Multiliteracy
 Critical literacy
 Numeracy
 Visual literacy
 Digital literacy

Notes

References
August, Diane. (2006).  Developing Literacy in Second-Language Learners: Report of the National Literacy Panel on Language-Minority Children and Youth. 1.  Retrieved March 24, 2007 from
BC Ministry of Education. (2006).  Information and Communication Technology Integration.  Retrieved December 1, 2006, from http://www.bced.gov.bc.ca/perf_stands/icti/.
BC Ministry of Education. (2005). Science K to 7: Integrated Resource Package 2005. 32. Retrieved December 1, 2006, from https://web.archive.org/web/20061007172614/http://www.bced.gov.bc.ca/irp/scik7.pdf
BC Ministry of Education. (1996).  Information Technology K to 7: Integrated Resource Package.  Retrieved December 1, 2006, from http://www.bced.gov.bc.ca/irp/resdocs/itk7.pdf
DuFour, R., Burnette, B. (2002) Pull out negativity by its roots.  [electronic version] Journal of Staff Development. 23 (2), para. 23.
 Fedorov, A. (2008). On Media Education. Moscow: ICOS UNESCO 'Information for All'.
International Society of Technology Educators.  (2004).  National Education Testing Standards – Students.  Retrieved November 15, 2006
Lambert, L.  (1998).  Building Leadership Capacity.  ASCD. Alexandria, Virginia 6, 23.
Media Awareness Network. (2003). Young Canadians in a wired world; The Students' View.  Retrieved on May 11, 2007 from
Media Awareness Network. (2005a).  Young Canadians in a wired world Phase II: Trends and Recommendations.  Valerie Steeves. Retrieved on March 19, 2007
upload/YCWWII_trends_recomm.pdf. Media Awareness Network. (2005b). Young Canadians in a wired world phase ii.  ERIN Research Inc. 6. Retrieved on March 19, 2007
Prensky, M. (2001). Digital Natives, Digital Immigrants. [electronic version] On the Horizon. 9 (5), 1.
Prensky, M. (2006). Listen to the Natives. [electronic version] Educational Leadership. 63 (4) 8 -13.
Surrey School District No. 36 (Surrey). (2005) Vision 2010 Strategic Plan. 1 – 4.  Retrieved May 8, 2007
Surrey School District No. 36 (Surrey).  (2007) Quick Facts. 1. Retrieved May 10, 2007
Wilhelm, J.  (2000).  Literacy by Design.  Voices from the middle, A publication of the national council of teachers of English. 7 (3). 4 – 14.  Retrieved May 11, 2007

Language
Literacy
Information science